Parawen is a Papuan language of Papua New Guinea.

References

Numagen languages
Languages of Madang Province